Marrying a Millionaire is a South Korean television series that aired on SBS from November 26, 2005 to January 22, 2006.

The series was partially inspired by the US reality show Joe Millionaire.

Storyline
Want to marry a millionaire? Add one Average Joe, be one of eight women selected, and money from the television network station and you can.

Han Eun-young works as a clerk at a bank, trying to pay off the debts her stepmother and sister have piled on her. Kim Young-hoon is your regular, "Average Joe" worker. He provides for his father, his older brother and his wife, as well as his younger brother.

One day, PD Yoo Jin-ha is asked to take over the project Marry a Millionaire. Reluctantly, he agrees to handle the project. His search begins for the perfect man to play the "millionaire." His goal is to use a man who is an average worker, but can pull off the facade of a millionaire. Kim Young-hoon is that man. Although he works hard for a living, there are many who can easily mistake him for a rich guy.

By chance, Eun-young is selected to be a participant in the TV show. Although the women are not supposed to know that this millionaire of theirs is just a regular worker, Eun-young knows his true identity. How? Simple. Young-hoon was her first love. After many years, they meet up again at a party. Although she did not recognize him at first, she realized it was the young boy she had fallen in love with back in middle school. Although she says she made a mistake in liking him, being in the show with him is bringing up warm feelings once again.

Cast 
Kim Hyun-joo as Han Eun-young
Go Soo as Kim Young-hoon 
Kim Ki-bum as young Kim Young-hoon
Yoon Sang-hyun as Yoo Jin-ha
Son Tae-young as Jung Soo-min 
Jung Jin as Jung Sung-sik
Lee Mi-young as Goo Jung-sun (Eun-young's stepmother)
Yoo Chae-yeong as Lee Soo-ji (Eun-young's stepsister)
Park Geun-hyung as Kim Jung-dae (Young-hoon's father)
Choi Sung-min as Kim Seung-hoon (Young-hoon's older brother)
Seo Jun-young as Kim Tae-hoon (Young-hoon's younger brother)
Kim Hee-jung as Jang Soo-ok

External links
 

Seoul Broadcasting System television dramas
2005 South Korean television series debuts
2006 South Korean television series endings
Korean-language television shows
South Korean romance television series
Television series by HB Entertainment